National Democratic Alliance is an Indian political party coalition led by Bharatiya Janata Party.
For the 2014 Indian general election, the NDA's candidates for the Lok Sabha constituencies are as follows.

Seat sharing summary

Andhra Pradesh

Arunachal Pradesh

Assam

Bihar

Chhattisgarh

Goa

Gujarat

Haryana

Himachal Pradesh

Jammu and Kashmir

Jharkhand

Karnataka

Kerala

Madhya Pradesh

Maharashtra

Manipur

Meghalaya

Mizoram

Nagaland

Odisha

Punjab

Rajasthan

Sikkim

Tamil Nadu

Tripura

Uttar Pradesh

Uttarakhand

West Bengal

Constituencies by Union territory

Andaman and Nicobar Islands (1)

Chandigarh (1)

Dadra and Nagar Haveli (1)

Daman and Diu (1)

Lakshadweep (1)

NCT of Delhi (7)

Puducherry (1)

See also
 List of Constituencies of the Lok Sabha
 List of Left Democratic Front candidates in the 2014 Indian general election
 List of United Progressive Alliance candidates in the 2014 Indian general election
 List of West Bengal Left Front candidates in the 2014 Indian general election
 Bharatiya Janata Party campaign for the 2014 Indian general election

References

National Democratic Alliance
National Democratic Alliance candidates in the Indian general election, 2014